The 1921 Loyola Wolf Pack football team was an American football team that represented Loyola College of New Orleans (now known as Loyola University New Orleans) as an independent during the 1921 college football season. In its first season under head coach William Flynn, the team compiled a 2–4 record and was outscored by a total of 110 to 59.

Schedule

References

Loyola
Loyola Wolf Pack football seasons
Loyola Wolf Pack football